Cash Asmussen (born March 15, 1962 in Agar, South Dakota) is an American thoroughbred horse racing jockey. Born Brian Keith Asmussen, in 1977 he legally changed his name to "Cash".

From a Texas horse racing family, his parents, Keith and Marilyn "Sis" Asmussen, operate a ranch in Laredo in Webb County, Texas. His brother, Steve Asmussen, is a successful horse trainer in American racing.

Career

Asmussen scored his first important graded stakes race win at the Beldame Stakes in 1979 and won that year's Eclipse Award for Outstanding Apprentice Jockey. In 1981, he rode Wayward Lass to victory in the Coaching Club American Oaks at Belmont Park (over the 1-5 entry of De La Rose and Heavenly Cause, who ran last and next-to-last), and traveled to Japan where he won the Japan Cup. The following year he won the Washington, D.C. International Stakes and his first of two Turf Classic Invitational Stakes then gained his most success as a jockey racing in France where he went to ride under contract for the wealthy stable owner, Stavros Niarchos.

While based at Chantilly Racecourse in Chantilly, France, Asmussen also scored victories in a number of important stakes races in England including the 1988 July Cup, 1989 Coronation Stakes, 1990 Coronation Cup, and the 1993 St. James's Palace Stakes. Racing in Ireland he won the 1987 Irish St. Leger and the 1988 National Stakes. Asmussen also returned to compete in the U.S. for various major races and won his second "Washington, D.C., International" in 1984 plus the 1988 and 1992 Arlington Million in Chicago. Internationally he also won the 1993 Canadian International Stakes and the 1997 Hong Kong Cup.

The first foreign rider to win the French riding title, between 1985 and 1990 Asmussen was the country's Champion jockey every year except for 1987 when he competed in Ireland. In 1991, he rode Suave Dancer to victory in the Prix de l'Arc de Triomphe, France's most prestigious race. In 1998, riding Dream Well Asmussen completed the double, by winning both the Irish and French Derby. During his career in France he won numerous other Group 1 races.

Asmussen retired from riding in 2001. Over the course of his career, he rode  more than 3,000 winners .

Major winners 

Canadian International Stakes: 1993 Husband
Arlington Million: 1988 Mill Native

Beldame Stakes: 1979 Waya
Vosburgh Stakes: 1980 Plugged Nickle, 1981 Guilty Conscience
Coaching Club American Oaks: 1981 Wayward Lass
Mother Goose Stakes: 1981 Wayward Lass
Turf Classic Invitational Stakes: 1982 April Run, 1994 Tikkanen
Washington, D.C. International Stakes: 1982 April Run, 1984 Seattle Song
Hollywood Derby: 1984 Procida
Arlington Million: 1992 Dear Doctor
Breeders' Cup Mile: 1997 Spinning World

Prix de l'Arc de Triomphe: 1991 Suave Dancer
Prix du Cadran: 1988 Yaka, 1992 Sought Out
Prix de l'Opéra: 1990 Colour Chart, 1998 Insight
Prix de la Forêt: 1993 Dolphin Street
Prix Jacques Le Marois: 1989 Polish Precedent, 1992 Exit to Nowhere, 1994 East of the Moon, 1996 & 1997 Spinning World
Grand Critérium: 1989 Jade Robbery, 1998 Way of Light
Grand Prix de Paris: 1989 Dancehall
Grand Prix de Saint-Cloud: 1988 Village Star, 1990 In the Wings, 1997 Helissio, 2000 Montjeu
Poule d'Essai des Pouliches: 1993 Madeleine's Dream, 1994 East of the Moon
Poule d'Essai des Poulains: 1983 L'Emigrant, 1986 Fast Topaze, 1993 Kingmambo
Prix d'Ispahan: 1987 Highest Honor, 1990 Creator
Prix du Jockey Club: 1991 Suave Dancer, 1993 Hernando, 1998 Dream Well, 1999 Montjeu
Prix de Diane: 1984 Northern Trick, 1994 East of the Moon, 1996 Sil Sila
Prix Royal-Oak: 1988 Star Lift
Prix Jean Prat: 1984 Mendez, 1985 Baillamont, 1986 Magical Wonder, 1989 Local Talent
Prix du Moulin de Longchamp: 1984 Mendez, 1988 Soviet Star, 1989 Polish Precedent, 1993 Kingmambo, 1997 Spinning World, 2000 Indian Lodge
Prix de la Salamandre: 1983 Seattle Song, 1993 Coup de Genie
Prix Ganay: 1984 Romildo, 1990 Creator
Prix Lupin: 1983 L'Emigrant, 1986 Fast Topaze, 1993 Hernando
Prix Maurice de Gheest: 1990 Dead Certain, 1995 Cherokee Rose
Prix Morny: 1993 Coup de Genie
Prix Vermeille: 1984 Northern Trick, 1996 My Emma

Hong Kong Cup: 1997 Val's Prince

Irish St. Leger: 1987 Eurobird
National Stakes: 1985 Tate Gallery, 1987 Caerwent
Irish Derby: 1998 Dream Well, 1999 Montjeu
Irish 2,000 Guineas: 1996 Spinning World
Irish Champion Stakes: 1991 Suave Dancer

 Japan Cup: 1981 Mairzy Doates

 Great Britain
July Cup: 1988 Soviet Star
Coronation Stakes: 1989 Golden Opinion
Coronation Cup: 1990 In the Wings
St. James's Palace Stakes: 1993 Kingmambo
Racing Post Trophy: 1991 Seattle Rhyme
Cheveley Park Stakes: 1989 Dead Certain
Fillies' Mile: 1993 Fairy Heights
Haydock Sprint Cup: 1991 Polar Falcon, 1995 Cherokee Rose
Middle Park Stakes: 1990 Lycius

References
 Cash Asmussen at the NTRA
 August 22, 1983 Sports Illustrated article on Cash Asmussen's success in riding in France
 January 9, 2004 Dallas Observer article titled "Good as Cash -  The unlikely story of the greatest Texas athlete you've never heard of"

1962 births
Living people
People from Sully County, South Dakota
People from Laredo, Texas
American jockeys
Eclipse Award winners